Cacoscelis is a genus of flea beetles in the family Chrysomelidae, found in southern North America, Central America, and South America.

Species
These 12 species belong to the genus Cacoscelis:

 Cacoscelis abdominalis Jacoby, 1904
 Cacoscelis argentinensis (Bechyné, 1951)
 Cacoscelis bicolorata Clark, 1865
 Cacoscelis coerulea Csiki, 1939
 Cacoscelis famelica (Fabricius, 1787)
 Cacoscelis flava Clark, 1865
 Cacoscelis lucens Erichson, 1847
 Cacoscelis marginata (Fabricius, 1775)
 Cacoscelis melanoptera (Germar, 1821)
 Cacoscelis nigripennis Clark, 1865
 Cacoscelis sallei Jacoby, 1884
 Cacoscelis varians Jacoby, 1891

References

External links

 

Alticini
Chrysomelidae genera
Taxa named by Louis Alexandre Auguste Chevrolat